The 1930 Purdue Boilermakers football team was an American football team that represented Purdue University during the 1930 college football season. In their first season under head coach Noble Kizer, the Boilermakers compiled a 6–2 record, finished in third place in the Big Ten Conference with a 4–2 record against conference opponents, and outscored opponents by a total of 150 to 41.

Schedule

References

Purdue
Purdue Boilermakers football seasons
Purdue Boilermakers football